Staedtler Mars GmbH & Co. KG is a German multinational stationery manufacturing company based in Nuremberg. The firm was founded by J.S. Staedtler (1800–1872) in 1835 and produces a large variety of stationery products, such as writing implements (including technical drawing instruments), art materials, and office supplies.

Staedtler claims to be the largest European manufacturer of wood-cased pencils, overhead projector pens, mechanical pencils, leads, erasers, and modelling clays. Staedtler has over 26 global subsidiaries and nine manufacturing facilities. Almost two thirds of the production take place in the four production facilities in Nuremberg, Germany, though some of its products are made in Japan. Its "Noris''' line of pencils is extremely common in British schools.

 History 
The origins of the brand can be traced since the 17th century, when Friedrich Staedtler took over the totality of the pencil manufacturing process, from the lead to the wood. However, that activity was forbidden by the Council of Nuremberg, which stated that the manufacturing had to be developed by two different experts. Eventually, Staedtler's work helped to abolish that regulation, therefore facilitating the work of other pencil manufacturers in Nuremberg.

The company was founded by Johann Sebastian Staedtler in 1835 as a pencil factory, first established in Nuremberg, but the roots of the company go back to 1662, when references to Friedrich Staedtler as a pencil-making craftsman were made in the city annals. Staedtler received permission from the municipal council to produce black lead, red chalk and pastel pencils in his industrial plant. In 1866, the company had 54 employees and produced 15,000 gross (2,160,000 pencils) per year.

In 1900, Staedtler registered the Mars brand (which represented the Ancient Roman god of war), using the name for some lines of products, also launching the head of Mars logo, and the Staedtler products are distributed in Italy in the same year. In 1901 the Noris brand was released by the company.

In 1922 a United States subsidiary (located in New York) was established, It was followed by a Japanese subsidiary four years later. In 1937 the name was changed to Mars Pencil and Fountain Pen Factory and the product range was expanded to include mechanical writing instruments. In 1949 began the production of ballpoint pens, which started to be widely used instead of fountain pens (although Staedtler still produces the latter today).

In 1950 propelling pencils (or mechanical pencils) began to be manufactured, the first being made out of wood. Four years later, the "Lumocolor" brand was registered. This brand was used to design the wide range of Staedtler markers. The head of Mars became the Staedtler definitive logo in 1958. This logo has had several style modifications since then, the last in 2001.

In 1962 the company began producing technical pens. In 1967 the Italian subsidiary, in Milan, was established. In the 1970s, Staedtler bought the Neumarkt factory, which used to be the Eberhard Faber factory. Nevertheless, in 2009 Staedtler sold the rights to the brand "Eberhard Faber" to Faber-Castell, although the company kept the Neumarkt factory, where Staedtler makes wood pencils nowadays. 
 
As from 2010, Fimo (modelling clay products), Mali, Aquasoft and further brands were marketed under the Staedtler name. In addition, the company celebrated its 175th anniversary that same year.

 Products 
Staedtler's products include: Noris, Mars Lumograph (pencils); Mars plastic (erasers); 925- series (mechanical pencils), Mars micro (pencil leads); Triplus (fineliners); Textsurfer (highlighters); Lumocolor'' (markers, colored pencils etc.).
 
The following chart contains all the Staedtler product lines:

References

External links

   
 Staedtler's eraser collection

Manufacturing companies based in Nuremberg
Art materials brands
German brands
Companies established in 1835
Pencil brands
Office supply companies of Germany
Pen manufacturers
Manufacturing companies established in 1835
Oil paint brands
Ink brands